Perricone is a surname. Notable people with the surname include:

Charles R. Perricone (born 1960), American politician
Michael Perricone, American sound engineer, musician, television writer, and entrepreneur
Nicholas Perricone (born 1948), American celebrity doctor